Hoffmeyer's Legacy is a 1912 comedy short directed by Mack Sennett and notable for being the first Keystone Cops comedy. However, many consider the first real Keystone Cop comedy to be The Bangville Police (1913).

Cast
 Ford Sterling ... Hoffmeyer
 Charles Avery ...	Keystone Kop
 Bobby Dunn ... Keystone Kop
 Chester M. Franklin ... Man in police station
 George Jeske ... Keystone Kop	
 Fred Mace	... Hoffmeyer's wife (in drag)
 Edgar Kennedy ...	Keystone Kop
 Hank Mann	... Keystone Kop
 Mack Riley ... Keystone Kop
 Mack Sennett ... Police Chief
 Slim Summerville ... Keystone Kop

External links
 

1912 films
1912 comedy films
Silent American comedy films
American silent short films
American black-and-white films
Films directed by Mack Sennett
Keystone Studios films
1912 short films
American comedy short films
1910s English-language films
1910s American films